Rivka Ladin is an American computer scientist.

Education 
Ladin obtained a Ph.D. in computer science from the Massachusetts Institute of Technology in 1989. The title of her thesis was "A Method for Constructing Highly Available Services and a Technique for Distributed Garbage Collection". Her supervisor was Barbara Liskov.

Patents

Bibliography

References 

Year of birth missing (living people)
Living people
American computer scientists
American women computer scientists
MIT School of Engineering alumni
21st-century American women